Mount Hope Township is located in McLean County, Illinois. As of the 2010 census, its population was 1,103 and it contained 455 housing units.

Geography

Demographics

References

External links
City-data.com
Illinois State Archives
Community hall served McLean for nearly a century - Pantagraph (Bloomington, Illinois newspaper)

Townships in McLean County, Illinois
Townships in Illinois